Aristides Agramonte y Simoni (June 3, 1868 – August 19, 1931) was a Cuban American physician, pathologist and bacteriologist with expertise in tropical medicine.  In 1898 George Miller Sternberg appointed him as an Acting Assistant Surgeon in the U.S. Army and sent him to Cuba to study a yellow fever outbreak. He later served on the Yellow Fever Commission, a U.S. Army Commission led by Walter Reed which examined the transmission of yellow fever.
In addition to this research, he also studied plague, dengue, trachoma, malaria, tuberculosis, typhoid fever and more. After serving on the Yellow Fever Commission, he served as a professor at the University of Havana as well as many government positions.

See also
James Carroll
Carlos J. Finlay
Jesse William Lazear

References

Publications

 Reprinted by the Journal in 1983:

External links
University of Virginia Health Sciences Library: A Guide to the Philip S. Hench Walter Reed Yellow Fever Commission This extensive collection includes 154 boxes of items.

1868 births
1931 deaths
American pathologists
Cuban emigrants to the United States